Hyposmocoma petroptilota is a species of moth of the family Cosmopterigidae. It was first described by Lord Walsingham in 1907. It is endemic to the Hawaiian islands of Kauai, Oahu, Maui and Hawaii. The type locality is Kīlauea.

The larvae feed on dead wood of Metrosideros and Pelea species.

External links

petroptilota
Endemic moths of Hawaii
Moths described in 1907
Taxa named by Thomas de Grey, 6th Baron Walsingham